Jabal an-Nour ( or 'Hill of the Illumination') is a mountain near Mecca in the Hejaz region of Saudi Arabia. The mountain houses the grotto or cave of Hira', which holds tremendous significance for Muslims throughout the world, as the Islamic prophet Muhammad is said to have spent time in this cave meditating, and it was here that he received his first revelation, which consisted of the first five ayats of Surah Al-Alaq from the angel Jibra'il (as is pronounced in certain Quran recitation schools and some Arab tribes; also known as Gabriel). It is one of the most popular tourist attractions in Makkah. There are 1750 steps to the top which, even for a fit individual, can take anywhere between half an hour and one-and-a-half hours.

Etymology
This is where Muhammad is said to have had his first revelation and received five verses of the Quran, the mountain was given the title Jabal an-Nūr ("Mountain of the Light" or "Mountain of the Enlightenment"). This experience is sometimes identified with the beginning of revelation; hence the present name. The date of the first revelation is said to be during the night on August 10, 610 A.D. Or, Monday the 21st of Ramadan, making Muhammad 40 lunar years, 6 months and 12 days of age, i.e. 39 solar years, 3 months and 22 days.

Appearance
One physical feature that differentiates Jabal al-Nour from other mountains and hills is its unusual summit, which makes it look as if two mountains are on top of each other. The top of this mountain in the mountainous desert is one of the loneliest of places. However, the cave within, which faces the direction of the Kaaba, is even more isolated. While standing in the courtyard back then, people could only look over the surrounding rocks. Nowadays, people can see the surrounding rocks as well as buildings that are hundreds of meters below and hundreds of meters to many kilometers away. Hira is both without water or vegetation other than a few thorns. Hira is higher than Thabīr, and is crowned by a steep and slippery peak, which Muhammad with some companions once climbed.

Geology 
The mountain is composed of intrusive igneous rocks, predominantly Precambrian aged coarse grained hornblende tonalite, with subordinate granodiorite.

Cave of Hira

The Cave of Hira was of minor significance before Islam, its name comes from hira (jewels). During the Hajj (pilgrimage), an estimated five thousand visitors climb to it daily to see the place where Muhammad is believed to have received the first revelation of the Quran on the Laylat al-Qadr (night of power) by the angel Jibreel (Gabriel). Most Muslims do not consider visiting the cave an integral part of the Hajj. Nonetheless many visit it for reasons of personal pleasure and spirituality, and though some consider it a place of worship, this view conflicts with Salafist interpretations of Islamic ritual. While the cave plays an important role in As-Sīrah an-Nabawiyyah (prophetic biography), it is not considered as holy as other sites in Mecca, such as the Al-Haram Mosque, and so under most interpretations of Islam, the same reward is received for praying here as any other place in Mecca.

Before Muhammad's first revelation, he had transcendental dreams, in which were signs that his prophethood had begun and that the stones in Mecca would greet him with the salaam. These dreams lasted for six months.

An increasing need for solitude led Muhammad to seek seclusion and meditation (Muraqabah) in the rocky hills which surrounded Mecca. He retreated to the cave for one month each year, engaging in seclusion (Tahannuth). He took provisions and fed the poor who came to him. Before returning home to his family for more provisions, he would circumambulate the Kaaba seven times.

Gallery

See also

 Biblical Mount Sinai
 Cumorah
 Holiest sites in Islam
 Sacred mountains
 Sarat Mountains

References

External links
 3D Tour of Hira Cave
 360° Virtual Tour of Hira Cave
 In pictures: Hajj preparations (Pictures #4 and #5 are of Jabal an-Nūr and the Hira cave)

Nour, Jabal
Gabriel
Islamic holy places